Route 96 is a city route in Winnipeg, Manitoba, Canada.  The route commences at Portage Avenue (Route 85) and ends at Wilkes Avenue (Route 145).

Route description
Route 96 begins as Moray Street at Portage Avenue and heads south, becoming the William R. Clement Parkway as it reaches the bridge over the Assiniboine River.  The Parkway ends at Grant Avenue (Route 105), at which point Route 96 turns east and runs concurrently with Route 105 through the Assiniboine Forest.  It turns south again at the Canadian Mennonite University campus and follows Shaftesbury Boulevard to its end at Wilkes Avenue.

History
The Moray Street south extension and Charleswood Bridge, the original part of Route 96, were built in 1995.  The William R. Clement Parkway, originally known as the Charleswood Parkway, opened in 2002.  The Charleswood Bridge and Parkway were renamed after the late Charleswood city councillor Bill Clement in 2010.

Future

The City of Winnipeg is currently planning to reroute City Route 96 by extending the William Clement Parkway to Wilkes Avenue.  This project was originally expected to be completed by 2016; however, the project was put on hold in 2017 pending a new precinct plan by Winnipeg city council.

Major intersections
From north to south:

See also

References

096
Winnipeg 096
Parkways in Canada